Mix Me a Person is a 1962 British crime drama film directed by Leslie Norman, starring Anne Baxter, Donald Sinden, Adam Faith, Walter Brown and Carole Ann Ford. The screenplay concerns a young London criminal who is faced with being hanged for murdering a policeman. With even his defence counsel convinced of his guilt, a female psychiatrist tries to prove that the police and legal system have made a mistake.

Plot
Phillip Bellamy, a leading barrister, tells his wife, psychiatrist Anne Dyson, about his most recent case defending a young man, Harry Jukes, who has apparently shot a policeman on a country road and been found by police still holding the gun. Bellamy is convinced of his guilt but Anne is less sure. Much of her practice is with troubled young people, and she feels there is more to the story than the police evidence.

Anne visits Harry in prison. He is depressed and distrustful but finally agrees to talk to her. Harry's story is that he took a Bentley Continental car to impress a girl, but when she went off with another boy, Harry decided to take the car for a spin before dumping it. Swerving to avoid another car, he burst a tyre, but could not find any tools in the boot to change the wheel. A policeman on a bicycle stopped to help. At the policeman's suggestion, Harry asked a couple in a car parked in the copse nearby for help, but disturbed at being caught in an illicit tryst, they refused and drove away.  Harry next flagged down a lorry to ask to borrow a jack. The lorry stopped, but a passenger immediately produced a gun and shot the policeman. Harry managed to grab the gun from the killer as the lorry drove away. A few minutes later, a police car arrived and Harry was arrested.

Anne believes Harry's story and, having failed to persuade Bellamy of Harry's innocence, begins her own investigation, just as Harry is found guilty and sentenced to death by hanging. She visits Taplow, the owner of the stolen Bentley, and finds his account unconvincing. She also visits Harry's friends at their regular hangout, a café in Battersea, and they agree to help her. They give her items that support details of Harry's story, but this evidence is not accepted by the authorities. Two boys search for the couple in the parked car, while one boy, Dirty Neck, takes a job at Taplow's frozen food depot to do some investigating there. Taplow meanwhile is pressured by Terence, an IRA operative, to resume illegal gun dealing activities, although Taplow wants to wait until after Harry is hanged.

Harry's friends locate the courting couple, and they and Anne confront the couple in the park. The woman is ready to co-operate, but the man panics and in trying to get away crashes into a tree, killing himself and severely injuring his girlfriend, who then makes a useless statement. On the eve of Harry's execution, Dirty Neck informs Anne that something odd is happening at Taplow's warehouse. Anne goes there to investigate and is imprisoned by Terence in the cold store, but Taplow helps her escape, convincing the trigger-happy Terence not to shoot her. Anne calls the police who have actually been looking into the case again.

It transpires that an IRA outfit are planning to rob an arms lorry on its way between bases, with Taplow supplying a delivery lorry to carry the guns. A previous attempt had been aborted because of a policeman intervening and being shot dead, for which the innocent Harry was blamed and now stands convicted. The police intercept Taplow and Terence driving the lorry full of arms and both men are fatally shot, but Taplow manages to give police a deathbed statement clearing Harry. Harry is released from prison, and rejoins his mates at the cafe.

Cast
 Anne Baxter – Doctor Anne Dyson
 Donald Sinden – Phillip Bellamy QC
 Adam Faith – Harry Jukes
 David Kernan – Socko
 Frank Jarvis – Nobby
 Peter Kriss – Dirty Neck
 Carole Ann Ford – Jenny
 Antony Booth – Gravy
 Topsy Jane – Mona
 Jack MacGowran – Terence, the IRA man
 Walter Brown – Max Taplow
 Glyn Houston – Sam
 Dilys Hamlett – Doris
 Meredith Edwards – Johnson
 Alfred Burke – Lumley
 Russell Napier – PC Jarrold
 Ed Devereaux – Superintendent Malley
 Ray Barrett – Inspector Wagstaffe
 Nigel Davenport – Jukes' Stepfather

References

External links
 

1962 films
1962 crime drama films
Films directed by Leslie Norman
British crime drama films
Films with screenplays by Ian Dalrymple
Films produced by Victor Saville
1960s English-language films
1960s British films